Tackett Mountain may refer to:
Tackett Mountain (Texas) is a summit near Graham, Texas, USA
Tackett Mountain (Arkansas) is a summit in the Ozarks, Arkansas, USA

See also
Tackitt (disambiguation)